Kjetil Ulven (born 16 November 1967) is a Norwegian ski-orienteering competitor and world champion. He won a gold medal in the relay event at the World Ski Orienteering Championships in Val di Non in 1994, together with Lars Lystad, Harald Svergja and Vidar Benjaminsen. He received a bronze medal in the short distance in Windischgarsten in 1998, and a bronze medal in the middle distance in Borovetz in 2002.

References

1967 births
Living people
Norwegian orienteers
Male orienteers
Ski-orienteers
20th-century Norwegian people